is a song by Kurumi Enomoto, released as the fifth and final single from her second album Notebook II: Bōken Note-chū, two months before the album's release.

The song was used as the ending theme song for Tales of the Abyss, an anime adaption of the Namco role-playing video game of the same title. The single was produced by Motoo Fujiwara, lead vocalist of the band Bump of Chicken, and the band's producer and longtime collaborator with Enomoto, Mor. Bump of Chicken's song Karma was used as the original game's theme song, as well as the opening theme song for the anime.

The single was released in two versions: a limited edition featuring a DVD, plus a regular CD only version. The DVD features the music video for the song, along with an acoustic performance of it and a special animated video with clips from the anime. The CD+DVD limited edition featured a sticker with Abyss characters Luke and Asch, while the regular version featured a general themed Abyss sticker.

The B-sides of the single were also written by Mor and Motoo Fujiwara. This is the first release by Enomoto where she has no song writing input into the lyrics/music of all of the songs. All three songs appear on Enomoto's second album, Notebook II: Bōken Note-chū.

Track listing

Single

DVD

Chart rankings

Oricon charts (Japan)

Various charts

References 

2008 singles
Tales (video game series) music
Japanese-language songs
2008 songs